Potamotrygonocotyle is a genus of monogeneans that parasitise stingrays of the genus Potamotrygon. From 1981 the genus contained only one member, P. tsalickisi, until four new species were described in 2007.

Species
P. chisholmae Domingues & Marques, 2007
P. dromedarius Domingues & Marques, 2007
P. eurypotamoxenus Domingues & Marques, 2007
P. tsalickisi Mayes, Brooks & Thorson, 1981
P. uruguayensis Domingues & Marques, 2007

References

Monopisthocotylea
Monogenea genera